The Babur-class corvette, also known as the PN MILGEM class, is a class of four heavy corvettes under construction for the Pakistan Navy. This class is a subclass of the Turkish MILGEM project. The corvette class is heavier and larger than the Turkish  and are also equipped with VLS.

Instrumentation

Armament
Anti-surface warfare
As for its anti-surface warfare (ASuW) capabilities, the corvettes feature two triple-cell launchers for six anti-ship missiles of an undisclosed designation. Although the missiles-in-question are yet to divulged, it is believed that they may actually be the Harbah anti-ship cruise missiles (ASCM), currently in service with the Pakistan Navy.

Anti-air warfare
As for its anti-air warfare (AAW) capabilities, the corvettes feature a 12-cell GWS-26 vertical launching system (VLS) configuration - according to illustrations of the vessels released by KSEW. Opposingly, other illustrations of the corvettes released by INSY depict a 16-cell VLS arrangement at the bow.

Initially, the corvettes were selected to feature the Chinese-origin HHQ-16 surface-to-air missiles, developed by the China Aerospace Science and Technology Corp (CASC). However, in 2021 - the Pakistan Navy revealed that it had selected the Albatros NG surface-to-air missiles developed by MBDA, instead. Incidentally, the PN MILGEM corvettes are also the first surface warships to utilize the Albatros NG.

Anti-submarine warfare
As for its anti-submarine warfare (ASW) capabilities, the corvettes feature two 3-cell Mark 32 324 mm lightweight torpedo tubes, along with an anti-submarine helicopter. Although the helicopter's designation is yet to divulged, it is believed that the corvettes may feature the AgustaWestland AW159 Wildcat.

Guns
The corvettes feature one OTO Melara 76 mm naval gun, one Aselsan GOKDENIZ 35 mm close-in weapon system and two Aselsan STOP 25 mm remote weapon stations - for providing short-range point defense against both aerial and surface threats.

Sensors
In a parallel fashion to the Ada-class corvettes, the Babur class feature similar radar equipment, including :-

Radar
The PN MILGEM class is equipped with the SMART-S Mk2 passive electronically scanned array (PESA) radar, license manufactured by Aselsan.

The class also features the Aselsan ALPER low-probability-of-intercept radar (LPI) - for detecting and tracking both aerial and surface targets.

Sonar
The corvettes feature the Meteksan YAKAMOS sonar system, as its primary sonar suite.

Electronic warfare
As part of its electronic warfare (EW) capabilities, the corvettes feature the Aselsan ARES-2N radar ESM system, along with ELINT and SIGINT modules. The ARES-2N is a long-range electronic support system, capable of detecting, intercepting, classifying, tracking and recording electromagnetic emissions of various targets, over an operating frequency of 2-18 GHz.

Tracking systems

In addition to the two aforementioned systems, the class is also equipped with the Northrop Grumman LN-270 INS/GPS navigation system, for providing geopositioning and turret stabilization.

Ships of the class

See also

Ships of notable comparison and era
  - A class of multi-mission corvettes currently being built for the Qatari Emiri Navy.
  - A class of anti-submarine corvettes operated by the Indian Navy.
  - A class of anti-surface corvettes operated by the Royal Navy of Oman.
  - A class of guided-missile corvettes operated by the Indonesian Navy.
 Gowind 2500 corvette - A class of multi-mission corvettes currently being built for the Egyptian Navy.
  - A class of multi-purpose corvettes operated by the Russian Navy.

Other references to the Pakistan Navy
List of active ships in the Pakistan Navy

References

Corvette classes